Simaan M. AbouRizk is a Canadian engineer, currently the NSERC/Alberta Construction Industry Senior Industrial Research Chair in Construction Engineering and Management and, formerly the Canada Research Chair in Operations Simulation from 2001 to 2008, at University of Alberta.

References

Year of birth missing (living people)
Living people
Academic staff of the University of Alberta
Canadian engineers